Muhammad Shahril Saabah (born 28 March 1994) is a Malaysian field hockey player.

In 2011, he made his debut with the senior national team in the inaugural Asian Champions Trophy. In the same year he won the Sultan of Johor Cup with the Project 2013 squad scoring a goal in the final against Australia.

References

1994 births
Living people
People from Selangor
Malaysian people of Malay descent
Malaysian Muslims
Malaysian male field hockey players
Field hockey players at the 2014 Asian Games
Field hockey players at the 2018 Asian Games
Medalists at the 2018 Asian Games
Asian Games medalists in field hockey
Asian Games silver medalists for Malaysia
Field hockey players at the 2014 Commonwealth Games
Sportspeople from Kuala Lumpur
Male field hockey midfielders
Southeast Asian Games gold medalists for Malaysia
Southeast Asian Games medalists in field hockey
Competitors at the 2017 Southeast Asian Games
Commonwealth Games competitors for Malaysia
2014 Men's Hockey World Cup players
2023 Men's FIH Hockey World Cup players